Ubida ramostriellus is a moth in the family Crambidae. It was described by Francis Walker in 1863. It is found in Australia, where it has been recorded from Queensland, New South Wales and Victoria.

The wingspan is about 40 mm. The forewings are brown with branching white stripes.

References

Crambinae
Moths described in 1863